Peter Nowill (born 15 June 1979) is an Australian long-distance runner who competed in the 2004 Summer Olympics.

Competition record

References

1979 births
Living people
Australian male steeplechase runners
Australian male long-distance runners
Olympic athletes of Australia
Athletes (track and field) at the 2004 Summer Olympics
People educated at Padua College (Brisbane)
Athletes (track and field) at the 2006 Commonwealth Games
Commonwealth Games competitors for Australia
21st-century Australian people